The New Zealand national cricket team toured Australia in the 1982-83 season and played a total of 21 matches, mostly One Day Internationals in the Benson & Hedges World Series Cup against Australia and England. New Zealand reached the finals of the competition but lost to Australia 2-0. A highlight of the finals series was a 21-ball half century from Lance Cairns at the Melbourne Cricket Ground containing 6 sixes. This was a world record for One Day Internationals at the time.

Bushfire Appeal Challenge Match

In order to raise funds for the 1983 bushfires, the New Zealanders returned to Australia, a month after they played in the Benson & Hedges World Series Cup.

References

External sources
 CricketArchive – tour summaries

Annual reviews
 Playfair Cricket Annual 1983
 Wisden Cricketers' Almanack 1983

Further reading
 Chris Harte, A History of Australian Cricket, Andre Deutsch, 1993

1982 in Australian cricket
1982 in New Zealand cricket
1982–83 Australian cricket season
1983 in Australian cricket
1983 in New Zealand cricket
International cricket competitions from 1980–81 to 1985
1982-83